Calumpit station is a former railway station located on the North Main Line in Bulacan, Philippines. The station was once part of the line until its discontinuation in 1988. It is currently being rebuilt as part of the second phase of the North–South Commuter Railway.

History 
The station has been used for passenger and freight transportation by the Philippine National Railways (PNR) and its precursors in the past. The station was to be rebuilt as a part of the Northrail project, which involved the upgrading of the existing single track to an elevated dual-track system, converting the rail gauge from narrow gauge to standard gauge, and linking Manila to Malolos in Bulacan and further on to Angeles City, Clark Special Economic Zone and Clark International Airport. The project commenced in 2007, but was repeatedly halted then discontinued in 2011. The old station will be preserved.

Gallery

References

Philippine National Railways stations
Railway stations in Bulacan
Railway stations opened in 1891